A Roadside Impresario is a 1917 American silent drama film directed by Donald Crisp and written by George Beban. The film stars George Beban, Jose Melville, Julia Faye, Harry De Vere, Harrison Ford, and Fred Huntley. The film was released on June 18, 1917, by Paramount Pictures.

Plot

Cast

References

External links

1917 films
1910s English-language films
Silent American drama films
1917 drama films
Paramount Pictures films
Films directed by Donald Crisp
American black-and-white films
American silent feature films
1910s American films